The Youngstown Pride was a professional basketball team that competed in the World Basketball League during the late 1980s and early 1990s. Based in Youngstown, Ohio, the Pride was established in 1987 by Phar-Mor executive Michael I. Monus and performed well during its five-year lifespan. They were one of only three teams to ever win a WBL championship.

In 1988, the Pride closed its second season with a 28-26 record, placing third in a five-team league that included franchises from Calgary, Las Vegas, Chicago, Fresno, and Vancouver. The following year, the team fared better, sweeping the WBL league championship in two games over the Calgary 88's. Youngstown closed the season with a 31-13 record, compared to Calgary's 31-13.

In 1990, the Youngstown Pride enjoyed its best season, when it seized a second straight WBL championship with a stunning record of 38-8. The next year, the Pride competed well in the WBL's Northern Division, closing the 1991 season with a 26-25 record and placing second in the five-team division.

During its final season in 1992, the Pride posted a 22-13 record, placing second in what was now a 10-team league. At this point, however, the WBL was in trouble, and it disbanded before the close of the season. The league's unraveling is attributed to waning public interest.

References 

Sports in Youngstown, Ohio
Basketball teams in Ohio
World Basketball League teams
Defunct basketball teams in the United States
Basketball teams established in 1985
1985 establishments in Ohio
1992 disestablishments in Ohio
Basketball teams disestablished in 1992